Aïn Abid is the capital of the Aïn Abid District in Constantine Province, Algeria.

References

Populated places in Constantine Province
Communes of Algeria